Nain Kala Thapa is a Nepali politician and was Minister of Information and Communications of Government of Nepal. She is the wife of former Home Minister of Nepal Ram Bahadur Thapa. Nainakala Thapa has been entrusted with the responsibility of the Government of Nepal spokesperson. The role of spokesperson is normally given to the Minister of Information and Communications.

See also
Second Oli cabinet
  Minister of Information and Communications

References

Living people
Nepal Communist Party (NCP) politicians
Government ministers of Nepal
Communist Party of Nepal (Unified Marxist–Leninist) politicians
Year of birth missing (living people)
Nepal MPs 2022–present